Canton Township is the name of some places in the U.S. state of Pennsylvania:
Canton Township, Bradford County, Pennsylvania
Canton Township, Washington County, Pennsylvania

Pennsylvania township disambiguation pages